Gert is a mainly masculine given name (short form of Gerrit, Gerard, etc.) with some female bearers (short for Gertrude).

Since 1993 no one in Sweden has been baptised as Gert according to the Swedish Bureau of Census, so the name is becoming increasingly rare. In 2010 around 12,000 in Sweden had the name as their first name according to the same source. Gert is most common in Sweden among men over 50 years of age. Around 400 women in Sweden have Gert as their first name according to the Swedish Bureau of Census.

Sports
Gert Aandewiel (born 1969), Dutch football player and manager
Gert Andersen (born 1939), Danish handball player
Gert Bals (1936–2016), Dutch footballer
Gert Bender (born 1948), German motorcycle racer
Gerrit "Gert" van den Berg (1903-?), Dutch cyclist
Gert Blomé (born 1934), Swedish ice hockey player
Gert Bolmer (born 1983), Dutch dressage equestrian
Gert Bongers (born 1946), Dutch track cyclist
Gert Brauer (born 1955), German footballer
Gert Claessens (born 1972), Belgian footballer
Gert Coetzer (born 1940s), South African rugby player
Gert De Kock (born 1980), South African rugby player
Gert Dockx (born 1988), Belgian road cyclist
Gert Dorbek (born 1985), Estonian basketball player
Gert Dörfel (born 1939), German footballer
Gert Doumen (born 1971), Belgian football goalkeeper
Gert Eg (born 1954), Danish footballer
Gert Elsässer (born 1949), Austrian skeleton racer
Gert Engels (born 1957), German footballer
Gert Frank (born 1956), Danish cyclist
Gert Fredriksson (1919-2006), Swedish sprint canoer and coach
Gert Handberg (born 1969), Danish motorcycle racer
Gert Heerkes (born 1965), Dutch football manager
Gert Heidler (born 1948), German footballer
Gert Bo Jacobsen (born 1961), Danish boxer
Gert Jakobs (born 1964), Dutch racing cyclist
Gert Jõeäär (born 1987), Estonian road bicycle racer 
Gert Kams (born 1985), Estonian footballer
Gert Kleinert (born 1930s), East German slalom canoeist
Gert Kölli (born 1940), Austrian swimmer
Gert Krenn, Austrian bobsledder 
Gert Kruys (born 1961), Dutch football player and manager
Gert Kullamäe (born 1971), Estonian basketball player
Gert Jan Lebbink (born 1961), Dutch sprint canoer
Gert Lotter (born 1993), Namibian cricketer and rugby player
Gert Lundqvist (1937–2001), Swedish footballer
Gert Metz (1942–2021), German sprinter
 Gert Muller (rugby union, born 1986), South African rugby union player
 Gert Muller (rugby union, born 1948), South African rugby union player
Gert Munkholm, Danish karting champion and father of Kevin Munkholm, also a Danish karting champion
Gert Olesk (born 1973), Estonian footballer
Gert Peens (born 1974), South African-born Italian rugby player
Gert Pettersson (born 1950s), Swedish orienteering competitor
Gert Potgieter (born 1937), South African hurdle runner
Gert Schalkwyk (born 1982), South African footballer
Gert Jan Schlatmann (born 1963), Dutch field hockey player
Gert Smal (born 1961), South African rugby player
Gert Steegmans (born 1980), Belgian road bicycle racer
Gert Thys (born 1971), South African long-distance runner
Gert Trasha (born 1988), Albanian weightlifter
Gert Trinklein (born 1949), German footballer
Gert van der Merwe, South African paralympic athlete
Gert Van Walle (born 1987), Belgian volleyball player
Gert Verheyen (born 1970), Belgian retired footballer
Gert Weil (born 1960), Chilean retired shot putter
Gert Wieczorkowski (born 1948), German footballer
Gert Jan van Woudenberg (born 1951), Dutch rower
Gert Wünsche (born 1943),  German footballer

Arts and entertainment
Gert Bettens (born 1970), Belgian guitarist
Gert Chesi (born 1940), Austrian photographer, author, journalist and filmmaker
Gert van Egen (c. 1550–1612), Flemish sculptor active in Denmark
Gert Fredholm (born 1941), Danish film director and screenwriter
Gert Fröbe (1913–1988), German actor
Gert Fylking (born 1945), Swedish actor, journalist, politician and anchorman
Gert van Groningen (died 1577), Dutch-born sculptor active in Denmark
Gert Haucke (1929–2008), German film and television actor
Gert Helbemäe (1913–1974), Estonian writer and journalist
Gert Hildebrand (born 1953), German car designer
Gert Hofbauer (born 1937), Austrian conductor and trumpeter
Gert Günther Hoffmann (1929–1997), German actor and director
Gert Hofmann (1931–1993), German writer and literary scholar
Gert Jonke (1946-2009), Austrian poet, playwright and novelist
Gert Krawinkel (1947–2014), German guitarist known as "Kralle"
Robert Gerhard "Gert" Ledig (1921–1999), German writer
Gert Louis Lamartine (1898–1966), German painter, sculptor and interior designer
Gert Miltzow (1629–1668), Norwegian clergyman, theologian and historical writer
Gert Neuhaus (born 1939), German artist
Gert Nygårdshaug (born 1946), Norwegian author
Gert Palmcrantz (born 1938), Swedish sound engineer
Gert Potgieter (1929–1977), South African tenor
Gert Prokop (1932–1994), German science fiction writer
Gert Sellheim (1901–1970), German-Australian artist
Gert Smit (1944–1998), South African singer known as "Gene Rockwell"
Gert van den Bergh (1920–1968), South African film actor
Gert Verhulst (born 1968), Belgian television presenter, actor and singer
Gert Vlok Nel (born 1963), South African poet
Gert Voss (1941–2014), German actor
Gert Wiescher (born 1944), German graphic artist, type designer and author
Gert Wilden (1917–2015), German film composer
Gert Wingårdh (born 1951), Swedish architect
Gert Heinrich Wollheim (1894–1974), German painter

Politics and military
Gert Alberts (1836–1927), South African Voortrekker
Gert Bastian (1923–1992), German military officer and politician
Gerrit "Gert" van den Berg (born 1935), Dutch politician
Gert Boshoff (1931–2014), South African Army lieutenant general
Gert Haller (1944–2010), German politician and manager
Gert Jeschonnek (1912–1999), German navy officer
Gert Petersen (1927-2009), Danish journalist and politician who helped found the Socialist People's Party
Gert Rosenthal (born 1935), Guatemalan diplomat
Gerhardus "Gert" Rudolph (1797–1851), South African Voortrekker and political leader
Gerrit Jan "Gert" Schutte (1939-2022), Dutch politician
 Gert Sibande (1907–1987), South African political activist
Gert Weisskirchen (born 1944), German politician
Gert Willner (1940–2000), German politician

Science and math
Gert Holstege (born 1948), Dutch neuroscientist
Gert Korthof, Dutch biologist
Gert Mittring (born 1966), German mental calculator
Gert Cornelius Nel (1885–1950), South African botanist
Gert Sabidussi (born 1929), Austrian mathematician
Gert Spaargaren (born 1954), Dutch environmental sociologist
Gert van Kruiningen (born 1961), New Zealand aeronautical engineer

Board games
Gert Ligterink (born 1949), Dutch chess player
Gert Schnider (born 1979), Austrian board-game player
Gert Jan Timmerman (born 1956), Dutch correspondence chess player

Business
Gertrude "Gert" Boyle (born 1924), German-born American businesswoman
Gert Joubert (bor 1948), Namibian businessperson
Gert Van Mol (born 1969), Belgian entrepreneur and CEO

Other
Gert Postel (born 1958), German impostor
Gert Schramm (1928–2016), German concentration camp survivor
Gert van Rooyen (1938–1990), South African serial killer

Fictional characters
One of the title characters of Gert and Daisy, a British film and radio comedy act
One of the title characters of the TV series Samson en Gert, a Flemish children's series
Gertrude Yorkes, a Marvel Comics superheroine and member of The Runaways

References

See also
Gert-Åke Bengtsson (born 1948), Swedish sports shooter
Gert-Arne Nilsson (born 1941), Swedish footballer
Gert-Dietmar Klause (born 1945), East German cross-country skier
Gert-Inge Sigfridsson (born 1946), Swedish footballer
Gert-Jan Bruggink (born 1981), Dutch show jumping equestrian
Gert-Jan Dröge (1943–2007), Dutch television presenter
Gert-Jan Kok (born 1986), Dutch motorcycle racer
Gert-Jan Liefers (born 1978), Dutch middle distance runner
Gert-Jan Oplaat (born 1964), Dutch politician
Gert-Jan Prins (born 1961), Dutch free improvisation musician
Gert-Jan Segers (born 1969), Dutch political scientist and politician
Gert-Jan Tamerus (born 1980), Dutch footballer
Gert-Jan Theunisse (born 1963), Dutch road cyclist
Gert-Johan Coetzee (born 1987), South African fashion designer
Gert-René Polli (born 1960), Austrian police officer

Danish masculine given names
Dutch masculine given names
Estonian masculine given names
German masculine given names
Swedish masculine given names
Hypocorisms